Kenneth Norton (2 November 1932 - ) was an English cricketer. He was a right-handed batsman and left-arm slow bowler who played for Northumberland. He was born in Gateshead and educated at Gateshead Secondary School, later called Gateshead Grammar School.

Norton played in the Minor Counties Championship for Northumberland between 1954 and 1980.

Norton appeared in three List A matches between 1971 and 1977. He did not bat in any of them, took one catch in the outfield, and bowled 18.4 overs in all, taking two wickets.

Norton's brother Don was a cricket umpire who stood in three List A matches.
He still holds the record for the most wickets for tynedale 
his grandson fenwick norton wants to follow in his footsteps and is already a greta batter and bowler

External links
Ken Norton at Cricket Archive

1932 births
2018 deaths
Cricketers from Gateshead
English cricketers
Northumberland cricketers